The Redwood Baronetcy, of Avenue Road in St Marylebone, is a title in the Baronetage of the United Kingdom. It was created on 24 July 1911 for Boverton Redwood. He was a leading expert on petroleum and an adviser to the Admiralty, India Office and Home Office. The third Baronet is a retired Colonel in the King's Own Scottish Borderers.

Redwood baronets, of Avenue Road (1911) 

 Sir Thomas Boverton Redwood, 1st Baronet (1846–1919)
 Bernard Boverton Redwood (1874–1911), son of Sir Boverton Redwood
 Sir Thomas Boverton Redwood, 2nd Baronet (1906–1974)
 Sir Peter Boverton Redwood, 3rd Baronet (born 1937)

Notes

References
Kidd, Charles, Williamson, David (editors). Debrett's Peerage and Baronetage (1990 edition). New York: St Martin's Press, 1990.

Redwood